Reusse is a surname. Notable people with the surname include:

Patrick Reusse, American sportswriter and radio personality
Peter Reusse (1941–2022), German actor

See also
Reusser